The ECHL All-Star Game is an exhibition ice hockey game that traditionally marks the midway point of the ECHL's regular season, with many of the league's star players playing against each other. The starting lineup for the teams, including the starting goaltender, is voted on by the coaches, players, and other league representatives.  The coaches for the All-Star Game teams are typically the head coaches of the teams that, at the time of the All-Star Game roster announcements, are leading their respective conferences in point percentage (i.e. fraction of points obtained out of total possible points).  The All-Star Game festivities also includes an ECHL All-Star Skills Competition, a competition showing the various talents of the all-stars.

In August 2011, the ECHL Board of Governors announced its intent not to hold an All-Star Game for the 2011–12 season, citing a desire to explore other options in preparation for celebrating the league's 25th anniversary during the 2012–13 season. This marked the first season since the All-Star Game's inception in 1993 that one was not be held. Since then, the ECHL also did not schedule an All-Star game in 2014 and 2016.

As of 2018, the ECHL has adopted a four-team, 3-on-3 player format and began calling the event the All-Star Classic. In 2020, the All-Star Game added players from the Professional Women's Hockey Player Association with Dani Cameranesi, Kali Flanagan, Gigi Marvin, and Annie Pankowski each being assigned to one of the four teams.

All-Star Game results

References

See also
ECHL
List of ECHL seasons

        
Ice hockey all-star games